Matthew Locke (c. 1621 – August 1677) was an English Baroque composer and music theorist.

Biography

Locke was born in Exeter and was a chorister in the choir of Exeter Cathedral, under Edward Gibbons, the brother of Orlando Gibbons. At the age of eighteen Locke travelled to the Netherlands, possibly converting to Roman Catholicism at the time.

Locke, with Christopher Gibbons (the son of Orlando), composed the score for Cupid and Death, the 1653 masque by Caroline-era playwright James Shirley. Their score for that work is the sole surviving score for a dramatic work from that era. Locke was one of the quintet of composers who provided music for The Siege of Rhodes (1656), the breakthrough early opera by Sir William Davenant. Locke wrote music for subsequent Davenant operas, The Cruelty of the Spaniards in Peru (1658) and The History of Sir Francis Drake (1659). He wrote the music for the processional march for the coronation of Charles II.

In 1673 Locke's treatise on music theory, Melothesia, was published. The title page describes him as "Composer in Ordinary to His Majesty, and organist of her Majesty's chapel"—those monarchs being Charles II and Catherine of Braganza. Locke also served King Charles as Composer of the Wind Music ("music for the King's sackbutts and cornets"), and Composer for the Violins. (His successor in the latter office was Henry Purcell, who composed an ode on the death of Locke entitled What hope for us remains now he is gone?, Z. 472; Locke was a family friend and may have had a musical influence on the young Purcell). In 1675 Locke composed the music for the score of Thomas Shadwell's Psyche.

See also
Drexel 3976

Notes

Sources
 Baker, Christopher Paul, ed. Absolutism and the Scientific Revolution, 1600–1720: A Biographical Dictionary. London, Greenwood Press, 2002.
 Caldwell, John. The Oxford History of Music: From the Beginnings to C. 1715.  Oxford, Oxford University Press, 1999.
 Harding, Rosamund E. M. A Thematic Catalogue of the Works of Matthew Locke with a Calendar of the Main Events of his Life. Oxford, Alden Press, 1971.

External links

 
 

English classical composers
English Baroque composers
English music theorists
Gentlemen of the Chapel Royal
1620s births
1677 deaths
17th-century classical composers
English male classical composers
17th-century English musicians
People educated at Exeter Cathedral School
17th-century male musicians